Forest-Range Environmental Study Ecosystems, known as FRES, is a system for the classification of ecosystems developed by the United States Forest Service as a management tool for the entire lower 48. Thirty four ecosystems were defined for grasslands, forests and woodlands.

Forest and woodland classification
FRES 10  White pine - red pine - jack pine
FRES 11  Spruce - fir
FRES 12  Longleaf - slash pine
FRES 13  Loblolly - shortleaf pine
FRES 14  Oak pine
FRES 15  Oak - hickory
FRES 16  Oak - gum - cypress
FRES 17  Elm - ash - cottonwood
FRES 18  Maple - beech - birch
FRES 19  Aspen - birch
FRES 20  Douglas-fir
FRES 21  Ponderosa pine
FRES 22  Western white pine
FRES 23  Fir - spruce
FRES 24  Hemlock - Sitka spruce
FRES 25  Larch
FRES 26  Lodgepole pine
FRES 27  Redwood
FRES 28  Western hardwoods
FRES 29  Sagebrush
FRES 30  Desert shrub
FRES 31  Shinnery
FRES 32  Texas savanna
FRES 33  Southwestern shrubsteppe
FRES 34  Chaparral - mountain shrub
FRES 35  Pinyon - juniper

Grassland classification
FRES 36  Mountain grasslands
FRES 37  Mountain meadows
FRES 38  Plains grasslands
FRES 39  Prairie
FRES 40  Desert grasslands
FRES 41  Wet grasslands
FRES 42  Annual grasslands

Alpine classification
FRES 44  Alpine meadows and barren

Notes

Ecosystems